Robert L. Hedlund (born July 12, 1961) is an American businessman and politician serving as the mayor of Weymouth, Massachusetts. He was formerly a member of the Massachusetts Senate representing the Plymouth and Norfolk District.

Education and career

Hedlund attended Wentworth Institute, Quincy College, and University of Massachusetts Boston.
Hedlund owned and operated Hedlund Motors located in Quincy, Massachusetts a truck and fire apparatus repair business from 1981 -1992.  
He was the host of "Monday Night Talk" on WATD-FM 95.9 in Marshfield, Massachusetts, and served as a substitute host on various talk radio shows on WRKO-AM 680 Boston.  He served as commissioner of New England Championship Wrestling from 2000-2001.

Hedlund was formerly a member of the Massachusetts Senate who represented the Plymouth and Norfolk District. His former Senate district included Cohasset, Duxbury, Hingham, Hull, Marshfield, Norwell, Scituate, and Weymouth.

On November 3, 2015, Hedlund was elected Mayor of Weymouth with 70% of the vote defeating longtime incumbent Mayor Susan M. Kay. Hedlund assumed office on January 4, 2016.

In November 2019 Hedlund was re-elected as Weymouth Mayor defeating Edward Cowen by a margin of 82% - 18%.

Personal life

Hedlund formerly  owned and operated the Four Square Restaurant & Bar in Braintree, Massachusetts.

References

External links 
Official biography
 General Court profile

Republican Party Massachusetts state senators
Mayors of places in Massachusetts
Living people
Wentworth Institute of Technology alumni
Quincy College (Massachusetts) alumni
University of Massachusetts Boston alumni
1961 births
Place of birth missing (living people)
Politicians from Quincy, Massachusetts
People from Weymouth, Massachusetts
American people of Swedish descent